Gastroblastea is a genus of cnidarians belonging to the family Campanulariidae.

Species:
 Gastroblastea ovale (Mayer, 1900)

References

Campanulariidae
Hydrozoan genera